Xenohormones or environmental hormones produced outside of the human body which exhibit endocrine hormone-like properties. They may be either of natural origin, such as phytoestrogens, which are derived from plants, or of synthetic origin. These compounds are able to activate the same endocrine receptors as their natural counterparts and are thus frequently implicated in endocrine disruption. The most commonly occurring xenohormones are xenoestrogens, which mimic the effects of estrogen. Other xenohormones include xenoandrogens (anabolic-androgenic steroids) and xenoprogesterones. Xenohormones are used for a variety of purposes including contraceptive & hormonal therapies, and agriculture. However, exposure to certain xenohormones early in childhood development can lead to a host of developmental issues including infertility, thyroid complications, and early onset of puberty. Exposure to others later in life has been linked to increased risks of testicular, prostate, ovarian, and uterine cancers.

Etymology
The term is derived from the Greek words ξένος (xenos), meaning "stranger". The prefix "xeno-" is added because xenohormones are foreign to the body, even though they mimic natural hormones.

Uses 
Xenohormones are found in a variety of different consumer products, agricultural products, and chemicals. Common sources of Xenohormones include:
 Contraceptives and Hormone Therapies

Xenohormones and xenoestrogens are commonly used in oral contraceptives such as birth control pills and hormone replacement therapies due to their similarities to natural hormones.
 Agriculture

Synthetic estrogenic drugs such as the bovine growth hormone (BVG) are commonly used to increase the size of cattle and maximize the amount of meat and dairy product that can come from them. Xenohormones are also found in certain pesticides, herbicides, and fungicides.
 Plastics

Xenohormones are found in almost all plastics, and they appear in many consumer products that use plastic elements or plastic packaging. Common xenohormones in plastics and other industrial compounds include BPA, Phthalates, PVC, and PCBs. These can be found in several household items, including plastic dishes and utensils, Styrofoam, cling wrap, flooring, toys, and other items containing plastic or plasticizers. In 2000, the FDA banned the use of phthalates in baby toys due to health concerns.
 Cleaning and Cosmetic Products

Many household products can contain certain xenohormones, including laundry detergent, fabric softeners, soap, shampoo, toothpaste, makeup and cosmetic products, feminine hygiene products.

Endocrinology 
Xenohormones can come from a variety of sources, both natural and man-made. Man-made xenoestrogens are often found in cosmetic products, some foods, certain pharmaceuticals, plastic products, flame retardants, and pesticides. Naturally occurring xenoestrogens include phytoestrogens (estrogen-like compounds from plants) and mycoestrogens (estrogen-like compounds from fungi).

While natural xenohormones exist, there are not as many compounds found in nature which are capable of interacting with human androgen receptors, so humans are most likely to come into contact with man-made xenoandrogens by taking anabolic steroids or through pollutants which contain xenoandrogens. "Organochlorine pesticides, polychlorinated biphenyls (PCBs), and polychlorinated dibenzo-p-dioxins/dibenzofurans (PCDDs/PCDFs)" are several pesticides known to contain xenoandrogens.

When present in excessive amounts within the human body, xenohormones can cause a host of health issues due to their disruption of the endocrine system. The name given to these exogenous (coming from an external source) hormones is “endocrine disruptors,” due to their tendency to mimic the behaviors of naturally produced bodily hormones. The negative effects of excessive xenoestrogen involve a long list of developmental abnormalities, especially when the exposure occurs during a critical postnatal period. When high levels of xenoestrogen are experienced shortly after birth, “urogenital tract and nervous system development” are hindered, as they are known to be “especially sensitive to hormonal disruption.” When exposure occurs during this early stage of life, these effects tend to be permanent.

The consequences of excessive xenohormone exposure in adulthood are different, and typically more temporary in nature. This is to say that the health risks can be minimized if the individual is removed from their state of excessive exposure. Xenohormone-related issues in adults frequently take the form of increased cancer risk in reproductive/secondary sexual areas (“breast, uterine, ovarian, prostate, testicular.” Sperm count in men and fertility in women have also been attributed to xenohormone exposure in adulthood. When present in the body, xenohormones can bind with estrogen receptors in the brain, leading to a disruption in the endocrine system as a whole. Such hormones have also been observed to interfere with the production of proteins. These “endocrine disruptors” have also been found to affect the levels and behaviors of a number of other bodily hormones. Because of this, it is difficult to establish a definitive relationship between xenohormones and health problems, making effects hard to predict.

Effect on Humans 
Research indicates that exposure to certain xenohormones can result in severe health risks, including infertility, early puberty, thyroid problems, endometriosis, and certain types of cancers. It has also been claimed that certain xenoestrogens, most commonly phytoestrogens and mycoestrogens can have beneficial health effects, though it is not yet clear to what extent the benefits are present or whether they outweigh the possible health risks of these compounds. Xenohormones and other endocrine disrupting compounds (EDCs) can block and disrupt the natural function of hormones and the endocrine system of the body, so conditions related to hormone imbalance or an improperly functioning endocrine system are possible after exposure. Certain xenohormones have been detected in the breast tissue of humans with breast cancer, which hints at a correlation between xenoestrogen exposure and breast cancer. This can occur in both men and women, although women may be more likely to develop breast cancer from xenohormones due to the popularity of cosmetic products among women. It may also be the case that women simply develop breast cancer in general more often than men, as there is no conclusive evidence that xenoestrogen-related breast cancers are more common among women than men after adjusting for the differing rates of breast cancer. Xenohormones are also linked to increased risks of testicular, prostate, ovarian, and uterine cancers.

Environmental Risks 
The use of xenohormones in both agriculture and industry raises concerns about their effect on the environment and public health. Xenohormones have been observed to contaminate food and water through the use of pesticides, hormone treatments in livestock, and plastic packing such as water bottles. In addition to posing health threats for humans, EDCs and xenohormones also pose health risks to wildlife. For example, PCBs can interrupt animal fetal development, cause changes in an animal's response to stress, and cause thyroid and immune function diseases. Plastics specifically pose a commendable environment threat due to the fact that many of them do not decompose. Xenohormones in plastic litter have the potential to contaminate natural water sources and expose both humans and wildlife to a variety of different EDCs.

Because Xenohormones such as BPA have demonstrated health concerns for humans and animals, both the Environmental Protection Agency (EPA) and FDA have conducted research and issued statements and regulations to reduce their impact on public health and the environment. In March 2010, the EPA published its Bisphenol A (BPA) Action Plan, which details measures to reduce the impact of BPA on aquatic species. These measures include identifying BPA as “a substance that may present an unreasonable risk of injury to the environment” and introducing new regulations to minimize the environmental impact of xenohormones like BPA.

See also
 Xenobiotic
 Xenoestrogen
 Anabolic steroid
 Bisphenol A

References 

Endocrinology
Environmental science
Hormones
Toxicology